A drumhead court-martial is a court-martial held in the field to hear urgent charges of offences committed in action. The term sometimes has connotations of summary justice.

The term is said to originate from the use of a drum as an improvised table, the drumhead forming the writing surface.

Origins 
The earliest recorded usage is in an English memoir of the Peninsular War (1807). The term sometimes has connotations of summary justice, with an implied lack of judicial impartiality, as noted in the transcripts of the trial at Nuremberg of Josef Bühler.

According to Sir Arthur Wynne Morgan Bryant, such courts-martial have ordered lashings or hangings to punish soldiers (and their officers) who were cowardly, disobedient, or, conversely, acted rashly; and especially as a discouragement to drunkenness. It is also used as a reference to a kangaroo court in its derogatory form.

World War II

Nazi Germany
From 1934, every division of the German Army had a court martial. After the occupation of Poland, the Oberkommando des Heeres wished to introduce a system which allowed speedy trials to be performed, as it was believed that a fast process would be a more effective deterrent. In November 1939 a law was passed which permitted drumhead trials if it was deemed necessary during warfare. Every commander of a regiment could either decide to inform the court martial of his division, or he could convene a drumhead trial when somebody was accused of a crime. The decision of a drumhead trial could be executed immediately. With the beginning of the year 1944 the high command formed a special police, the "High command Feldjägerkorps", which were in command of special drumhead trials named fliegende Standgerichte, composed of motorized judges.

During the last two months of World War II, Adolf Hitler authorized the use of Fliegendes Sonder-Standgericht ("flying special court martial" or "flying special drumhead"), mobile courts-martial used by the German armed forces. The use of "flying" refers to their mobility and may also refer to the earlier "flying courts martial" held in Italian Libya. Italian military judges were flown by aircraft to the location of captured rebels, where the rebels were tried in a court martial shortly after capture.

An example of this was the summary trial of five officers found guilty of failing to prevent the Western Allies from capturing the Ludendorff Bridge during the Battle of Remagen on 7 March 1945. On a direct order from Hitler, Generalleutnant Rudolf Hübner tried Major Hans Scheller, Captain Willi Bratge, Lt. Karl Heinz Peters, Maj. Herbert Strobel and Maj. August Kraft. Hübner, who had no legal experience, acted as both prosecutor and judge. He conducted extremely brief show trials during which he harangued the defendants for their alleged command failures, and then pronounced sentence. All of the officers were sentenced to death. Except for Bratge, who had been captured by the enemy, the others were taken to nearby woods within 24 hours, executed with a shot to the back of the neck, and buried where they fell.

After the failed plot to assassinate Hitler in July 1944, General Friedrich Fromm, after capturing the conspirators, hosted an impromptu court martial sentencing the lead conspirators to death by firing squad. Dietrich Bonhoeffer, accused of association with the assassination plot, was similarly tried and executed.

After Admiral Canaris, head of the Abwehr, the German military intelligence service, was suspected of involvement in the 20 July Plot to assassinate Hitler, Hitler authorised Heinrich Himmler to have Canaris tried and sentenced to death by a drumhead court-martial.

Imperial Japan

The Enemy Airmen's Act contributed to the deaths of hundreds of Allied airmen throughout WWII in the Pacific Theater. An estimated 132 Allied airmen shot down during the bombing campaign against Japan in 1944–1945 were summarily executed after short kangaroo trials or drumhead courts-martial.

In popular culture
The Star Trek: The Next Generation episode "The Drumhead" is focused on a drumhead court-martial. In that episode, the retired Rear Admiral Norah Satie returns to serve as an investigator, first to investigate possible sabotage, but the investigations scope is quickly expanded to other, unrelated crimes. A major plot device is the use of Betazoid telepathy as a sign of guilt, which is not admissible evidence under Federation law. Captain Jean-Luc Picard denounces the proceedings, which are explained as resembling a "drumhead court martial", hence the name.

References

Informal legal terminology
Court-martial